Monoporus is a genus of flowering plants belonging to the family Primulaceae.

Its native range is Madagascar.

Species
Species:

Monoporus bipinnatus 
Monoporus clusiifolius 
Monoporus floribundus 
Monoporus myrianthus 
Monoporus paludosus 
Monoporus spathulatus

References

Primulaceae
Primulaceae genera